Diplotaxis cribulosa is a species of scarab beetle in the family Scarabaeidae.

Subspecies
These two subspecies belong to the species Diplotaxis cribulosa:
 Diplotaxis cribulosa cribulosa LeConte, 1856
 Diplotaxis cribulosa sinaloa Vaurie, 1958

References

Further reading

 

Melolonthinae
Articles created by Qbugbot
Beetles described in 1856